Desolation Angels may refer to:
Desolation Angels (novel), a 1965 novel by Jack Kerouac
Desolation Angels (album), a 1979 album by Bad Company
Desolation Angels (1982 film), a 1982 Australian film
Desolation Angels (1995 film), a 1995 American film